Goldis Tower  (aka Borj-e Goldis ) is a shopping center located in the commercial district of Sadeghiyeh (Aryashahr) in west of Tehran, Iran. It is a 13-floors building among which 3 first floors are commercial and the upper 10 floors serve as office use. 
Towers in Iran
Buildings and structures in Tehran